Midway is an unincorporated community in Albemarle County, Virginia, near Charlottesville, Virginia. It lies at an elevation of 630 feet (192 m).

References

Unincorporated communities in Albemarle County, Virginia
Unincorporated communities in Virginia